The 2019 Étoile de Bessèges was a road cycling stage race that took place between 7 and 10 February 2019. The race was rated as a 2.1 event as part of the 2019 UCI Europe Tour, and was the 49th edition of the Étoile de Bessèges cycling race.

The race was won by French rider Christophe Laporte of the  team.

Teams
Twenty-two teams of up to seven riders started the race:

UCI WorldTeams

 
 
 
 
 

UCI Professional Continental Teams

 
 
 
 
 
 
 
 
 
 
 
 

UCI Continental Teams

Route

Stages

Stage 1
7 February 2019 – Bellegarde to Beaucaire,

Stage 2

8 February 2019 – Saint-Geniès-de-Malgoirès to La Calmette,

Stage 3
9 February 2019 – Bessèges to Bessèges,

Stage 4
10 February 2019 – Alès to Alès, individual time trial (ITT)

Classifications

Final classification standings

General classification

Points classification

Mountains classification

Young rider classification

Teams classification

References

External links
 

Etoile de Besseges
Etoile de Besseges
2019